The 2006 Maryland gubernatorial election was held on November 7, 2006. Incumbent Republican Governor Bob Ehrlich ran for a second term, but was defeated by the Democratic nominee, Baltimore Mayor Martin O'Malley. Ehrlich was the only incumbent governor from either party to lose a general election in the 2006 midterms.

Democratic primary

Candidates
Martin O'Malley, Mayor of Baltimore

Campaign
Baltimore Mayor Martin O'Malley and Montgomery County Executive Doug Duncan emerged as the two Democratic candidates for governor in late 2005. Early polling indicated that O'Malley would have the advantage in both the Democratic primary and the general election, with a solid lead over Duncan in the primary and a several point lead over Ehrlich in the general.

As the gubernatorial campaign intensified, Duncan withdrew from the race, citing his diagnosis with clinical depression. In the same announcement, he threw his support behind O'Malley and declined to seek another office in the fall. No other Democratic candidate had announced, so O'Malley was unopposed in the primary election.

O'Malley selected Anthony Brown, a black State Delegate from Prince George's County and a veteran of the Iraq War, as his running mate.

Results

Republican primary

Candidates
Bob Ehrlich, incumbent Governor

Campaign
Ehrlich sought a second term as governor and did not face opposition at any point in the Republican primary. Incumbent Lieutenant Governor Michael Steele ran for the U.S. Senate instead of seeking a second term as lieutenant governor, so Ehrlich named Maryland Secretary of Disabilities Kristen Cox, who is blind, as his running mate.

Results

General election

Candidates
Martin O'Malley, Mayor of Baltimore (D)
Bob Ehrlich, incumbent Governor of Maryland (R)
Ed Boyd, temporary employment agency recruiter (G)
Christopher A. Driscoll (P)

Campaign
Elected to his first term in 2002, incumbent Republican Governor Bob Ehrlich ran for a second term as governor, opposed by the Democratic nominee, Martin O'Malley, the Mayor of Baltimore. Both candidates emerged from uncontested primary elections and a contentious election season began.

Early in the campaign, Ehrlich boasted decent approval ratings from Maryland citizens, with a Gonzalez Research poll taken during October 2005 showing him with a 49% approval rating. and a Baltimore Sun poll from November 2005 giving the Governor a 50% approval and a 33% disapproval. However, the unpopularity of the national Republican Party and President George W. Bush dragged Ehrlich's re-election chances down.

Ehrlich launched attack ads that hit O'Malley on crime in Baltimore under his tenure as Mayor, calling the murder rate in Baltimore "awful" and "an embarrassment to the state of Maryland." O'Malley countered with one television ad that featured testimonials from local community leaders, Howard County Executive James N. Robey, Baltimore County Executive James T. Smith Jr. and another ad that attacked Ehrlich for breaking his promise to end parole for violent criminals.

The Washington Post and The Washington Times both endorsed Ehrlich in his bid for re-election, with the Times praising Ehrlich's "brand of moderate conservatism that offers a refreshing contrast" to the state's historically Democratic leanings and the Post called him "a generally proficient, pragmatic governor" and praised him for "successes on transportation, the environment and education."

In turn, The Baltimore Sun endorsed O'Malley, saying, "the progress under the mayor's tenure is clear and irrefutable", and that he addressed "rising crime, failing schools and shrinking economic prospects." O'Malley also called upon the praise given to him by TIME Magazine when they named him one of the country's "Top 5 Big City Mayors."

Predictions

Polling

Results

References

External links
Official list of candidates provided by the State of Maryland Board of Elections
Official re-election website of Governor Ehrlich
Official election website of Martin O'Malley

Gubernatorial
2006
Maryland
Martin O'Malley